Happily Ever After may refer to:

Film and television

Film
Happily Ever After (1985 film), a Brazilian romantic drama film directed by Bruno Barreto
 Happily Ever After (1989 film), an animated movie continuing the adventures of Snow White and her prince
 Happily Ever After (2004 film) (Ils se marièrent et eurent beaucoup d'enfants), a French film
 Happily Ever After, a 2005 Filipino film featuring Yasmien Kurdi
 Happily Ever After (2007 film) (Jigyaku no Uta), a Japanese film by Yukihiko Tsutsumi
 Happily Ever After (2009 film), a Hong Kong film by Azrael Chung and Ivy Kong
 Happy Ever Afters, a 2009 Irish film by Stephen Burke
 Happily Ever After, a 2016 film starring Janet Montgomery and Sara Paxton

Television 
 Happily Ever After (1961 TV series), a British sitcom
 Happily Ever After (2007 TV series), a Singaporean Chinese drama
 Happily Ever After? (Brazilian TV series) or Felizes para Sempre?, a 2015 miniseries
 Happily Ever After: Fairy Tales for Every Child, a 1995-2000 animated series on HBO
Happily Ever After?, a spin-off of the American reality series The Bachelor
Happily Ever After (2020 TV series), an Indian web series

Episodes
 "Happily Ever After" (Charmed)
 "Happily Ever After" (How I Met Your Mother)
 "Happily Ever After" (Law & Order)
 "Happily Ever After" (Lost)
 "Happily Ever After" (Shameless)

Literature
 "Happily ever after", a stock phrase used in fairy tales to signify a happy ending
 Happily Ever After, a 1997 children's book by Anna Quindlen
 Happily Ever After, a 1993 play by Elliott Hayes
 "Happily Ever After", a short story by Aldous Huxley, included in his 1920 collection Limbo

Music

Albums
 Happily Ever After (Rose Chronicles album), 1996
 Happily Ever After, by the Cure, 1981
 Happily Ever After (G.E.M. album), 2019
 Happily Ever After, by Mount Sims, 2009
 Happily Ever After (EP), by NU'EST, 2019
 Happily Ever After, an EP by Andrew Sandoval (recording as "Andrew")

Songs
 "Happily Ever After" (song), by Case
 "Happily Ever After", by David Choi
 "Happily Ever After", by He Is We from My Forever
 "Happily Ever After", by Donna Summer from Once Upon a Time
 "Happily Ever After", by Red Velvet from Rookie, 2017
 "Happily Ever After", written by Stephen Sondheim for the musical Company and later used in the musical revue Marry Me a Little
 "Happily Ever After", written by Mary Rodgers and Marshall Barer for the musical Once Upon a Mattress
 "Happily Ever After", from Steven Universe: The Movie
 "Happily Ever After (Now and Then)", by Jimmy Buffett from Banana Wind

Other uses
 Happily Ever After (Magic Kingdom), a nightly pyrotechnic show at the Magic Kingdom at the Walt Disney World Resort

See also 
 "Happily Ever Aftermath", an episode of Grimm
 Happily N'Ever After, a computer-animated film based on the fairy tales of the Brothers Grimm
 "Happily Never After" (CSI: NY)
 Unhappily Ever After, a 1995–1999 American sitcom
 Happy Ever After (disambiguation)
 Ever After (disambiguation)